Jemput-jemput or cekodok is a traditional fritter popular in Indonesia, Brunei, Malaysia and Singapore that is made from wheat flour. It is usually round in shape and tends to vary in size. There are many varieties of this snack, some using banana, anchovies or prawns, onion or maize.

References

Kue
Malay cuisine
Bruneian cuisine
Malaysian snack foods
Snack foods
Anchovy dishes
Shrimp dishes